APEA FC (Αθλητική Ποδοσφαιρική Ένωση Ακρωτηρίου, Athlitiki Podosfairiki Enosi Akrotiriou) is a Cypriot football club, based in Akrotiri. The club currently compete in the Cypriot Third Division after winning the 2021/2022 STOK Elite Division Championship.

History
APEA FC was formed in 1955. In January 2020, the club was taken over by Dutch businessman Jamory Leysner. In May 2021, a portion of the club was purchased by an American venture capitalist Rob Steiner.

On January 15, 2022, APEA made history by being the first club from the Fourth-Tier to transfer a player to the First-Tier of Cyprus football with Nick Kaaijmolen joining PAEEK FC.

On the 10th of April 2022, APEA FC made history by being crowned champions of the STOK Elite Division after defeating 'Group B' winners AEP Polimedion in the championship game 1-0. The team were crowned champions of their group after finishing the season of 22 games, with 16 wins, 5 draws and 1 loss, scoring 63 goals along the way and only conceding 7 goals.

Players

Current squad

References

1955 establishments in Cyprus
Football clubs in Cyprus
Association football clubs established in 1955